ARSD or ArsD may refer to:

ARS-D, the Alliance for the Re-liberation of Somalia
ArsD, a trans-acting repressor of the arsRDABC operon that confers resistance to arsenicals and antimonials in Escherichia coli; see Ars operon
ARSD, the United States Navy hull classification symbol for "salvage lifting vessel"; see also Rescue and salvage ship
ARSD, a type of arylsulfatase
ARSD, the New York Stock Exchange symbol for the Arabian American Development Company
Atma Ram Sanatan Dharma College, formerly Sanatan Dharma College, a co-educational constituent college of the University of Delhi in India
The American Roller Skating Derby, a professional roller derby league in the United States